Varun Toorkey is an Indian television actor known for portraying Shaad Khan in Qubool Hai and Tushar Mallick in Humko Tumse Ho Gaya Hai Pyaar Kya Karein.

Personal life
Born and brought up in Mumbai, Toorkey belongs to Parsi community.

He did his schooling in Bombay Cambridge School, JB Nagar, Mumbai and graduated from Mithibai college with a B.com degree.

Toorkey has attained training in acting from Anupam Kher's Actor Prepares.

Career
Toorkey was just 16 years of age when he got his first break into the industry, in a compilation album called Ustad and the divas. In that album, he acted as a computer professional in the song Leja Leja Re which was sung by Shreya Ghoshal and Ustad Sultan Khan. The album released in 2006.

He made his television debut in 2013, playing Sankrant in Colors TV's Uttaran.

In 2015, he played Shaad Aftaab Khan in Zee TV's Qubool Hai opposite Surbhi Jyoti.

In 2016, Toorkey played Tushar Malik in Humko Tumse Ho Gaya Hai Pyaar Kya Karein opposite Ishani Sharma.

From 2017 to 2018, he portrayed Anant Singh Baghel in Saam Daam Dand Bhed.

In 2019, he played Rishabh in Yeh Rishta Kya Kehlata Hai opposite Shivangi Joshi. Since July 2021, Toorkey is playing Kunal Malhotra in Choti Sarrdaarni opposite Nimrit Kaur Ahluwalia and Mahir Pandhi till October 2021.

Filmography

Television

Music videos

References

1990 births
Living people
Indian male television actors
Indian male models
Parsi people from Mumbai
Indian Zoroastrians
Male actors from Mumbai
21st-century Indian male actors
Male actors in Hindi television
Parsi people